"Song 2" is a song by English rock band Blur. The song is the second song on their eponymous fifth studio album. Released on 7 April 1997, "Song 2" peaked at number two on the UK Singles Chart, number four on the Australian ARIA Singles Chart, and number six on the US Billboard Modern Rock Tracks chart (now called the Alternative Airplay chart).

At the 1997 MTV Video Music Awards, "Song 2" was nominated for Best Group Video, and Best Alternative Video. At the 1998 Brit Awards, the song was nominated for Best British Single, and Best British Video. In 1998, BBC Radio 1 listeners voted "Song 2" the 15th Best Track Ever. In 2011, NME placed it number 79 on its list "150 Best Tracks of the Past 15 Years".

Background
According to Graham Coxon, "Song 2" was intended to be a joke on the record company. Damon Albarn had recorded an acoustic demo of the song which was slower but featured the song's distinctive "woo-hoo" chorus in whistle form. Coxon then suggested that they pump up the speed and perform the song loudly, with Coxon deliberately seeking out an amateurish guitar sound. From there, Coxon told Albarn to tell the record company that they wanted to release the song as a single to "blow the ... labels' heads off". To Coxon's surprise, record executives reacted positively. When asked if the band had any idea of the song's commercial appeal, Coxon replied, "We'd just thought it was way too extreme".

The track was originally nicknamed "Song 2" as a working title which represented its slot in the tracklist, but the name stuck. The song is two minutes and two seconds long, with two verses, two choruses and a hook featuring Albarn yelling "woo-hoo!" as the distorted bass comes in. It is the second song on Blur's self-titled album, as well as Blur: The Best Of, and was the second single released from the former album.

Some writers have stated that the song is intended to be a parody of the grunge genre, while others state that it was a parody of radio hits and the music industry with a punk rock chorus.

Genres and influences
Musically, the song has been labelled alternative rock, punk rock, indie rock, and britpop.

PopMatters described the song as a "[pastiche] [of] Seattle grunge and grubby lo-fi indie rock". Rolling Stone Australia, called it "frankly grunge-flavoured".

Reception
A reviewer from Music Week wrote, "This punky, new wavathon is more immediate than most of the cuts from their new album and all the better for the catchy "woo-hoo" bits." David Sinclair from The Times noted "the American garageband banging and crashing" of the song.

In the UK, "Song 2" built upon the success of Blur's chart-topping single "Beetlebum" to reach number two in the charts. It was also popular on radio stations in the US; consequently, it went at number 55 on the Hot 100 Airplay chart, number 6 on Billboards Modern Rock Tracks chart, staying on that chart for 26 weeks and number 25 on the Mainstream Rock Tracks chart. It also placed number two on Triple J's Hottest 100 for 1997 in Australia. The song is atypical of Blur's previous style. The song's intro has been called Graham Coxon's "finest moment". NME ranked "Song 2" at number two in its end-of-year list of the Top 20 Singles of 1997, and later listed it as one of the best songs from the 1990s.

Music video
The music video for this song was directed by Sophie Muller, and it features the band playing in a small, secluded room with loud amplifiers behind them. During the choruses, the volume of the song sends the band members crashing against the walls and ground. The set used was modelled on that in the video for their pre-breakthrough single "Popscene".

Live performances
My Chemical Romance played the song at BBC Radio 1. The cover was later featured on the album "Radio 1's Live Lounge", released on 11 October 2006.

On 20 October 2018, at the Demon Dayz Fest LA, Damon Albarn's other well-known band Gorillaz played the familiar Song 2 theme but in characteristic Gorillaz style with dub/funk elements. While recognition was still dawning on the audience, Graham Coxon joined Gorillaz onstage and launched into his original riff before he and Gorillaz went on to perform the classic arrangement to an enthusiastic reception.

During the end of his only 2022 U.S. solo performance to promote The Nearer the Fountain, More Pure the Stream Flows, Albarn commented that he was asked if he'd perform "Song 2" by L.A. Times journalist Mikael Wood, "before [Wood] cast [Albarn] into the social media abyss". Earlier that day, an interview published by Wood put Albarn into heavy controversy, with Albarn claiming in the article that musician Taylor Swift did not write her own songs. Swift would issue a harsh rebuke to this claim, with several of her friends and collaborators coming to her defense. Albarn would dedicate the song, which ended up closing the set, to Wood.

Track listings
All music was composed by Albarn, Coxon, James and Rowntree. All lyrics were written by Albarn.

UK CD1
 "Song 2" – 2:02
 "Get Out of Cities" – 4:02
 "Polished Stone" – 2:42

UK CD2
 "Song 2" – 2:02
 "Bustin' + Dronin'" – 6:13
 "Country Sad Ballad Man"  – 4:59

UK 7-inch single and Italian CD single
 "Song 2" – 2:02
 "Get Out of Cities" – 4:02

French CD single
 "Song 2" – 2:02
 "Country Sad Ballad Man"  – 4:41
 "On Your Own"  – 4:10

Australian CD single
 "Song 2" – 2:02
 "Get Out of Cities" – 4:02
 "Polished Stone" – 2:42
 "Bustin' + Dronin'" – 6:13

Japanese mini-album
 "Song 2" – 2:02
 "Get Out of Cities" – 4:02
 "Polished Stone" – 2:42
 "Bustin' + Dronin'" – 6:13
 "Beetlebum"  – 5:07
 "Beetlebum"  – 5:07
 "Country Sad Ballad Man"  – 4:59
 "On Your Own"  – 4:26

Personnel
 Damon Albarn – vocals
 Graham Coxon – guitars, additional drums
 Alex James – bass guitars
 Dave Rowntree – drums

Charts

Weekly charts

Year-end charts

Certifications

Release history

In popular culture
The song became popular in the UK and overseas upon its release in 1997. It was featured on college and modern rock radio stations.

Licensed worldwide on numerous occasions, it made its first appearance in the episode "Malled" of the animated series Daria.

In 2010, Blur manager Chris Morrison said, "Northrop Grumman, which is an American defence contractor, got in touch with us and asked if they could use the song for their trade shows to promote the next generation of stealth fighters. We thought that was probably inappropriate. The money was great but we turned it down." Albarn is an antiwar campaigner.

"Song 2" was used as part of the London 2011 New Year's Eve fireworks display. It appeared in shortened form mixed alongside various other landmark British tracks including "Lucy in the Sky with Diamonds" by The Beatles, "We Will Rock You" by Queen, and "London Calling" by The Clash. It was also included in the London 2021-2022 New Year fireworks display.

The hook for the song was sampled in the 2012 song "Windows Down" by Big Time Rush.

The song featured on soundtrack of the 2012 Summer Olympics opening ceremony.

Film
The song was used in trailers for the film Starship Troopers, Thunderbirds and Hop.

It was used in BMW Films' short film Star featuring Clive Owen, Rhys Massey, and Madonna.

Sports
Japan national football team, Italian football team Juventus, Australian football team Western United, German football team FC St. Pauli and English football team Liverpool FC use this as their goal tune. The song is used  by numerous professional ice hockey teams, most notably the Ottawa Senators.
Former UFC Middleweight Champion Michael Bisping used the song as his walk-out entrance. It is currently being used as the goal song for the France national football team at the FIFA World Cup in Qatar.

Advertising
The song was featured in a TV Commercial for the Toyota Corolla in 1998 in Australia.

Television
The song appears in the Parks and Recreation episode "Prom". "Song 2" is also featured in "Sunday, Cruddy Sunday" of the animated series The Simpsons as part of a montage sequence which ends satirically. The song is also featured in the South Park episode, "Stanley's Cup".

Video games
The song is used as the title music for FIFA: Road to World Cup 98, is included on Just Dance 2 as a DLC song, is a playable song on Just Dance: Summer Party, Just Dance Kids 2 and Lego Rock Band, and is included in the main setlist of Guitar Hero 5. In addition, the song appears in Saints Row IV as a part of the radio station "107.77 The Mix FM" within the game. It is also among 30 licensed songs featured on the Wii game, We Cheer 2 where players can cheer to the song. A version of the song remixed by Madeon is featured in a FIFA 17 trailer. The song is included on FIFA 23 as part of the ultimate FIFA soundtrack for the 2022 FIFA World Cup in Qatar.

References

External links
 

1997 singles
1997 songs
Blur (band) songs
British punk rock songs
Grunge songs
Food Records singles
Music videos directed by Sophie Muller
Number-one singles in Scotland
Parlophone singles
Song recordings produced by Stephen Street
Songs about music
Songs written by Alex James (musician)
Songs written by Damon Albarn
Songs written by Dave Rowntree
Songs written by Graham Coxon
Virgin Records singles